The Federal Insurance Court of Switzerland (FIC; , ,) was an independent division of the Swiss Federal Supreme Court based in Lucerne. Responsible for judicial review of administrative decisions related to social security, it was composed of eleven full-time and eleven part-time judges.

Effective January 1, 2007, the FIC was completely merged with the Federal Supreme Court as the revised Federal Court Law entered into force.

Judges 
As of December 2006, the full-time judges of the FIC were:
 Aldo Borella
 Pierre Ferrari, vice president
 Jean-Maurice Frésard
 Yves Kernen
 Susanne Leuzinger-Naef, president
 Alois Lustenberger
 Ulrich Meyer
 Hansjörg Seiler
 Franz Schön
 Rudolf Ursprung
 Ursula Widmer-Schmid

The judges, now members of the regular Supreme Court, were elected by the Federal Assembly of Switzerland and served for six years; reelections were possible.

References 
  Status und Geschichtliches zum Eidgenössischen Versicherungsgericht, published by the court

External links 
 Website of the FIC

Insurance Court
Courts and tribunals with year of establishment missing
2006 disestablishments in Switzerland
Courts and tribunals disestablished in 2006